İnönü (formerly: Üçdere) is a quarter of the town Damal, Damal District, Ardahan Province, Turkey. Its population is 146 (2021).

References

Damal District